Tulsipur is a town and tehsil in the Balrampur district of the Indian state of Uttar Pradesh.

Geography
Tulsipur is located near the India-Nepal border on the banks of the River Nakti (also known as River Siria) and is 23 km from Koilabas and 190 km from the state capital Lucknow. It is located 28 km from Balrampur District.

History
The House of Tulsipur ruled one of the largest Taluqs of Oudh, India, which then included the Dang and Deukhuri Valleys.

Demographics
At the 2011 Indian Census, Tulsipur had a population of 24,488, of which 12,861 were males and 11,627 were females. The population within the 0-6 year age group was 3,686. The literate population numbered 14,259, which constituted 58.2% of the population with male literacy of 63.8% and female literacy of 52.1%. The effective literacy rate of the population aged 7 and over was 68.5%, of which male literacy rate was 74.9% and female literacy rate was 61.5%. The Scheduled Castes and Scheduled Tribes population was 1,119 and 24 respectively. Tulsipur had 3,776 households in 2011.

Education

Transport

Air 
The nearest domestic airport is Shravasti Airport and the nearest international airport is Chaudhary Charan Singh International Airport in Lucknow.

Railways
Tulsipur railway station is located in the city. Passenger, DEMU, and Express trains stop at the station.

See also
 Ghorahi, Nepal
 Tulsipur, Rapti
 House of Tulsipur - One of 22 Principalities and Taluqs of Oudh

References

Cities and towns in Balrampur district, Uttar Pradesh